Endicott-Johnson Medical Clinic, also known as the Wilson Hospital Annex, is a historic hospital building located at Binghamton, Broome County, New York. It was built in 1928 by the Endicott Johnson Corporation as a part of its "Square Deal" program.  It is a two-story, "T"-shaped steel frame building with a flat roof, clad in red brick.  It has a projecting central section that is four bays wide and a one-story enclosed portico.  It was sold in 1946 to the Wilson Memorial Hospital and used as an annex.  In 1967, it was purchased by New York State for use as a day care center for the Binghamton Psychiatric Center.

It was listed on the National Register of Historic Places in 2015.

References

Hospital buildings on the National Register of Historic Places in New York (state)
Hospital buildings completed in 1928
Buildings and structures in Binghamton, New York
National Register of Historic Places in Broome County, New York